Viktor Alexandrovich Goltsev (– ) was a Russian writer, lawyer, journalist, literary critic, publisher, and editor. He was an editor of "Russian Courrier", Russkiye Vedomosti, Russkaya Mysl.

A Moscow University alumnus, Goltsev authored numerous articles and essays on law and jurisprudence, as well as critical reviews and feuilletons, published in Russkiye Vedomosti, Russkaya Pravda, Golos, Vestnik Evropy, Russkoye Bogatstvo, Delo. In his much-publicized polemics with Ivan Aksakov and Mikhail Katkov he came across as a staunch proponent of the constitutional rule in Russia.

In 1880 Goltsev joined the just-launched Russkaya Mysl to become the head of its Political Review section. In March 1885 he succeeded the recently deceased Sergey Yuriev as this magazine's editor-in-chief. It was under his guidance that Russkaya Mysl drifted towards the left flank of Russian journalism and provided safe haven for many members of the stuff of the closed Otechestvennye Zapiski. Goltsev was friends with many Russian writers (Chekhov, Korolev, Ertel, Uspensky). Russkaya Mysl was the first magazine to publish Chekhov's "The Seagull" in 1925. In 1906, after Goltsev's death, Alexander Kisevetter became the editor-in-chief of Russkaya Mysl; he invited Pyotr Struve as a co-editor. 

Among Goltsev's books that came out as separate editions include The French State in the 17th Century (Государственное хозяйство во Франции XVII в., 1878), The Development of Pedagogy in Recent Times (Очерк развития педагогических идей в новое время, 1880), The Law and the Ways of Life in Russia in the 18th Century (Законодательство и нравы в России XVIII в., 1885), the collections of essays Education, Morality and Law (Воспитание, нравственность, право, 1889) and On Art (Об искусстве, 1890).

References 

1850 births
1906 deaths
People from Kolomna
People from Kolomensky Uyezd
Russian journalists
Russian editors
Imperial Moscow University alumni
Burials at Vagankovo Cemetery